The beta-3 adrenergic receptor (β3-adrenoceptor), also known as ADRB3, is a beta-adrenergic receptor, and also denotes the human gene encoding it.

Function 

Actions of the β3 receptor include
Enhancement of lipolysis in adipose tissue.
Thermogenesis in skeletal muscle

It is located mainly in adipose tissue and is involved in the regulation of lipolysis and thermogenesis. Some β3 agonists have demonstrated antistress effects in animal studies, suggesting it also has a role in the central nervous system (CNS). β3 receptors are found in the gallbladder, urinary bladder, and in brown adipose tissue. Their role in gallbladder physiology is unknown, but they are thought to play a role in lipolysis and thermogenesis in brown fat. In the urinary bladder it is thought to cause relaxation of the bladder and prevention of urination.

Mechanism of action 

Beta adrenergic receptors are involved in the epinephrine- and norepinephrine-induced activation of adenylate cyclase through the action of the G proteins of the type Gs.

Ligands

Agonists 

 Amibegron (SR-58611A)
 BRL-37344
 CL-316,243
 L-742,791 
 L-796,568
 LY-368,842
 Mirabegron (YM-178), approved for treatment of overactive bladder in Japan, United States, UK, Canada, China and India.
 Nebivolol selective beta(1)-blocker and beta(3)-agonist.
 Ro40-2148
 Solabegron (GW-427,353)
 Vibegron (MK-4618)

Antagonists 

 L-748,328
 L-748,337
 SR 59230A was thought to be a selective β3 antagonist but later found to also be an antagonist of the α1 receptor.

Interactions 

Beta-3 adrenergic receptor has been shown to interact with Src.

See also 
Other adrenergic receptors
Alpha-1 adrenergic receptor
Alpha-2 adrenergic receptor
Beta-1 adrenergic receptor
Beta-2 adrenergic receptor
Beta Blocker

References

Further reading

External links 
 
 

Adrenergic receptors